Marina Erakovic and Michaëlla Krajicek were the defending champions, but Erakovic chose not to participate that year.  Krajicek partnered with Yanina Wickmayer.

Seeds

Draw

Draw

External links
Doubles draw

Ordina Open - Women's Doubles
Ordina Open - Women's Doubles
Rosmalen Grass Court Championships